"Professional Rapper" is a song by American rapper Lil Dicky from his debut studio album of the same name. It was released on July 31, 2015 as the album's fourth single and title track. It was produced by Stan Lane and features a guest appearance by West Coast hip hop artist Snoop Dogg.

Commercial performance 
"Professional Rapper" debuted at number-one on the Billboard Comedy Digital Tracks chart dated  August 22, 2015.

Background
The song is presented as Lil Dicky interviewing for a job as a professional rapper with Snoop Dogg. In the interview, Snoop Dogg asks Lil Dicky about his background as well as what he likes about rap. Lil Dicky says one of his favorite things is autographing women's breasts. He also states he wants to approach rapping different because he feels it's been done the same way for too long, to which Snoop Dogg replies that it traditionally works. Lil Dicky proceeds to say one of his goals is to become one of the greats. At the end, Snoop Dogg says he has the job, if he can put together a hook for "this" song, in a self-aware meta sense referring to Professional Rapper. Lil Dicky puts together a hook, which is called "garbage" by Snoop Dogg.

Music video
The music video is animated. The video plays out the lyrics to the song as part of the fictional interview portrayed in the lyrics. During the line “ Well, I don't care about the money/Like, it's the respect that I'm wanting/Honestly, I just want to be one of the greats/Where they gotta bring your boy up every debate” Snoop Dogg and Lil Dicky are standing in front of pictures of rap legends including Eminem, 2Pac, The Notorious B.I.G., and Jay-Z.

Chart performance

Certifications

References

2015 singles
2015 songs
Lil Dicky songs
Snoop Dogg songs
Songs written by Snoop Dogg